Tina Louise ( Blacker; born February 11, 1934) is an American actress widely known for her role as movie star Ginger Grant in the CBS television situation comedy Gilligan's Island. With the death of Dawn Wells in 2020, Louise became the last surviving cast member of the TV series.

She began her career on stage in the mid-1950s before landing her breakthrough role in 1958 drama film God's Little Acre for which she received the Golden Globe Award for New Star of the Year.

Louise had starring roles in The Trap, The Hangman, Day of the Outlaw, and For Those Who Think Young. She also appeared in The Wrecking Crew, The Happy Ending, and The Stepford Wives (1975).

Early life 
Born Tina Blacker on February 11, 1934, in New York City, by the time she was four years old her parents had divorced. She was an only child and was raised by her mother Sylvia (née Horn), later Myers, a fashion model. Tina's father, Joseph Blacker, was a candy store owner in Brooklyn, and later an accountant.  

The name "Louise" was reportedly added during her senior year in high school when she mentioned to her drama teacher that she was the only girl in the class without a middle name, and he suggested it. She attended Miami University in Ohio after high school.

Career

Early work
Louise got her first role at age two after being in an ad for her father's candy store. She began studying acting, singing, and dancing at age 17 under Sanford Meisner at the Neighborhood Playhouse School of the Theatre in Manhattan. Her acting debut came in 1952 in the Bette Davis musical revue Two's Company, followed by roles in such other Broadway productions as John Murray Anderson's Almanac, Will Success Spoil Rock Hunter?, and  the hit musical Li'l Abner. She appeared in the live television dramas Studio One and Producers' Showcase.

She was offered modeling jobs, including the 1958 Frederick's of Hollywood catalog, and she appeared on the cover of several pinup magazines such as Adam, Sir!, and Modern Man. Her pictorials for Playboy in May 1958 and April 1959 were arranged by Columbia Pictures studio in an effort to promote her.

Hollywood and Gilligan's Island 
Louise made her film debut in 1958 in God's Little Acre. That same year, the National Art Council named her the "World's Most Beautiful Redhead." The next year, she starred in Day of the Outlaw with Robert Ryan. She became a leading lady for stars such as Robert Taylor and Richard Widmark, often playing sombre roles. She turned down roles in the films of Li'l Abner and Operation Petticoat, taking roles on Broadway and in Italian cinema. Among her Italian film credits were The Siege of Syracuse and Garibaldi (both in 1960).

Louise returned to the United States, began studying with Lee Strasberg, and became a member of the Actors Studio. In 1962, she guest-starred on the situation comedy The Real McCoys, portraying a country girl from West Virginia in the episode "Grandpa Pygmalion". She appeared with Bob Denver two years later in the beach party film For Those Who Think Young (1964). In 1964, she left the Broadway musical Fade Out – Fade In to portray movie star Ginger Grant on the situation comedy Gilligan's Island. Over time, she became unhappy with the role and was worried that it would typecast her. Although she continued to work in film and made guest appearances on television, she claimed repeatedly that playing Ginger had ruined her movie career. She did not appear in any of the subsequent Gilligan's Island sequel movies: Rescue from Gilligan's Island (1978), The Castaways on Gilligan's Island (1979), or The Harlem Globetrotters on Gilligan's Island (1981). Other actresses played the role of Ginger in the sequels. She maintained a steady acting career after the series ended, going on to appear in the Matt Helm spy spoof The Wrecking Crew (1969) with Dean Martin and in The Stepford Wives (1975).

Louise attempted to shed her comedic image by playing darker roles, such as a heroin addict in a 1974 episode of Kojak and as a cruel corrections officer in the 1976 television movie Nightmare in Badham County. Other television appearances included  supporting roles in Look What's Happened to Rosemary's Baby (1976), SST: Death Flight (1977), and the soap opera Dallas during the 1978–1979 seasons. In the fall of 1984, she succeeded Jo Ann Pflug as Taylor Chapin on the syndicated soap opera Rituals.

Later work
Later film roles included a co-starring appearance in the Robert Altman comedy O.C. and Stiggs (1987) as well as the independently made satire Johnny Suede (1992) starring Brad Pitt. She appeared in the situation comedy Married... with Children as Miss Beck in episode "Kelly Bounces Back" (1990). In 2014, Louise starred in the spiritual drama Tapestry and the horror film Late Phases.

Although Louise declined to participate in any of three Gilligan's Island reunion television films, she made brief walk-on appearances on a few talk shows and specials for Gilligan's Island reunions, including Good Morning America (1982), The Late Show (1988) and the 2004 TV Land award show with the other surviving cast members. In the 1990s, she was reunited with costars Bob Denver, Dawn Wells, and Russell Johnson in an episode of Roseanne. She did not reunite with them for the television film Surviving Gilligan's Island (2001), co-produced by Wells; Ginger was portrayed by Kristen Dalton in the television film. Her relations with series star Denver were rumored to be strained, but in 2005, she wrote a brief, affectionate memorial to him in the year-end "farewell" issue of Entertainment Weekly after his death.

Following the news of Dawn Wells' passing in December 2020, Louise denied any longtime rumors that she resented the role of Ginger Grant:  "Never true – I loved doing my part, especially after they really started writing for my character, originally billed as a 'Marilyn Monroe' type of character. A different director took over and really started to write for my character. I really loved my character." She also said that she was very grateful to the show's fans for their continued support, especially during the COVID-19 pandemic: "We were part of the wonderful show that everyone loves and has been a great source of comfort, especially during these times. We brought a lot of joy to people and still do. This show is an escape from so many things going on. Fathers share it with their children now. I get letters all the time about that."

Music
Louise made one record album, It's Time for Tina, which was released originally on Concert Hall in 1957 (Concert Hall 1521), and later reissued on Urania Records (1958 and 1959 respectively). With arrangements by Jim Timmens and Buddy Weed's Orchestra, 12 tracks include "Tonight Is the Night" and "I'm in the Mood for Love." Coleman Hawkins is featured on tenor sax. The album has been reissued on CD twice, most recently on the UK label Harkit Records. The album was released on iTunes in 2012.  She also recorded for United Artists Records but recorded just one single for that label in 1958.

Personal life
From 1966 to 1971, Louise was married to radio and TV announcer/interviewer Les Crane, with whom she had one daughter, Caprice, who became an MTV producer and a novelist. Tina Louise and Les Crane appeared together as a married couple on a 1973 episode of  Love American Style. Caprice Crane's first novel, Stupid and Contagious, was published in 2006, and was dedicated to her mother.

Louise is a member of the Academy of Motion Picture Arts and Sciences and a lifetime member of the Actors Studio. Louise has been a vocal advocate for improving child literacy. She donated a portion of the proceeds of her 2007 book, When I Grow Up, to literacy programs and said in a 2013 interview that she had been volunteering at local public schools since 1996. She has written three books including Sunday: A Memoir (1997) and When I Grow Up (2007). The latter is a children's book that inspires children to believe they can become whatever they choose through creative and humorous comparisons of animal kingdom achievements. She also published a second children's book titled What Does a Bee Do? in 2009.

Louise is quoted as saying, "The best movie you'll ever be in is your own life because that's what matters in the end."

A Democrat, she campaigned for John F. Kennedy during the 1960 presidential election.

Filmography

Film

Television

Stage work
Two's Company (1952)
The Fifth Season (1953) 
John Murray Anderson's Almanac (1953)
Will Success Spoil Rock Hunter? (1955) 
Li'l Abner (1956)
Fade Out – Fade In (1964)

References

External links

 
 
 
 
 

1934 births
Living people
20th-century American actresses
21st-century American actresses
Actresses from New York City
American women singers
American film actresses
American musical theatre actresses
American television actresses
New Star of the Year (Actress) Golden Globe winners
Miami University alumni
New York (state) Democrats
California Democrats